Claudio Wílliman Gonzalez (born 10 October 1861 in Montevideo – † 9 February 1934 in Montevideo) was a Uruguayan political figure.

Background

Claudio Wílliman's parents, José Williman and Antonia González, were immigrants from Galicia, Spain. José Wílliman's parents himself came from Savoy, France, with Alsatian roots.

Wílliman was a member of the Uruguayan Colorado Party and was closely identified with the liberal José Batlle y Ordóñez.

His grandson José Claudio Wílliman served in the Uruguayan Senate 1985–1990.

President of Uruguay

He was the de facto caretaker president of Uruguay chosen by José Batlle y Ordóñez to succeed him after his first term in office.

Williman was chosen by Batlle to succeed him as Uruguayan presidents were constitutionally barred from serving consecutive terms. His policies generally followed those of Batlle. Williman had indicated that he would continue Batlle’s policies in a speech he made to the legislature after taking the oath of office. In his speech, he praised the outgoing government for “its noble and just preoccupation with the betterment of the humble” and called for measures such as a new Ministry of Public Education, a government labor office, reorganisation of public charity, and regulation of corporations. He also stated the need “to resolve the problem of populating the interior, which in the midst of great prosperity remains half deserted, since it is not the existence of a handful of great fortunes which constitutes the wealth of a nation.” As noted by one study, “This last sentence got a great round of applause, and the whole speech sat well with the Colorado legislators.”

A number of projects were approved during Williman’s presidency, including Credits from the Banco de la República for farmers and Reorganization and modernization of the Department of Livestock and Agriculture. A 1908 law provided for the safeguarding of pensions and wages against garnishment. A number of laws were passed concerning commercial, criminal and civil matters, including ones related to the conditional release of convicts, absolute divorce, marks of factory and trade, the legitimacy of natural children, abolition of the death penalty, and the abolition of the third instance in criminal matters. Propaganda against occupational diseases was carried out, and posters containing prophylactic measures against carbuncle or bad grain and other diseases were distributed throughout the country. Departmental Hygiene Inspections were also established to replace Councils which had been in operation since 1895. A Labor Office was also installed. Williman had called for the establishment of a Labor Office or institute, “destined to study everything that is related to the progress of the industries and the aspirations of the workers, in order to cooperate in the solution of the questions and conflicts and, prepare the most opportune legislation in this matter.” Through Law 3,147 of 1907 the Ministry of Industry, Labor and Public Instruction was established. In 1911 a military pension fund was established “to administer survivors’ pensions for all military officers.” Many new public schools were also built, and in 1908 the Executive Power requested and obtained sanction of a law authorizing the creation of the National Institute for the Deaf. Money was also spent on public improvements, such as transit and sanitary works. Many public works were carried out. In the capital this included the extension and completion of Boulevard Artigas al Sud, completion of Avenida Brasil, completion of Rambla Pocitos, construction of the Agricultural Market, construction of the Military and Naval School building, construction of the Blandengues Regiment barracks, police buildings, and groups of school buildings. According to one study “In the departments there were innumerable road works, construction of bridges, sanitation, municipal services, canalizations, dredging, authorization of ports, layout and extension of railways, carried out by the same administration, whose intense work was translated in the economic and financial order in the constantly reproduced fact of the "surplus" in the annual exercises.” 392 schools were also built, almost all of which rural. A law of  February the 24th 1911 , “completely regulated the loss and restitution of parental authority , guardianship of minors and the creation of the Council for the Protection of Minors,” and a law of 1908 “recognized the right of all mothers to proper maternity care,” although in the absence of any machinery this was “a counsel of perfection” until Montevideo in 1915 opened its maternity hospital with 150 beds. In 1909, the Executive Power requested and obtained the abolition of a 5% discount on salaries that public employees had been subject to since 1893. The School Medical Corps was created by law of the Nation and regulated in 1908, entrusting it with “the mission of hygienic surveillance of school buildings, teaching staff, school materials, furniture, programs, prophylaxis of infectious-contagious diseases, study of school retarded, etc. , designating 4 members to perform these tasks.” Developments in public assistance took place, with one presidential message from 1910 noting "Equally worthy of mention , under another concept , are the results obtained by the change of regime in the Maternal and Foundling Homes , with the operation of the " Gota de Leche " clinic , whose benefits have been completed with the holding of popular conferences on childcare , dedicated to mothers, and the creation of the Vacation Colony, which has just been joined by children belonging to Public Schools and poor parents, protected by the "Uruguayan League against Tuberculosis."

In 1908, the head of the Labor Office Dr. Juan José Amézaga presented a bill on workplace accidents which was passed immediately by the Executive Branch passed to the Assembly. As established by this project, employers or entrepreneurs who are in charge of exploiting an industry or carrying out work included in this law (such as mines, quarries, factories, metallurgical workshops, mines, quarries and factories) “were civilly liable for all accidents that occur to their workers or employees due to their work or due to it.” Pensions would be provided in cases of absolute or permanent incapacity, partial and permanent disability, temporary disability, and death. The Work Commission of the Chamber of Deputies, accepted the general lines of the project in an important study, which led “to the rapid sanction of the law in that branch of the Legislative Body.” However, a different environment prevailed in the Chamber of Senators, and the project remained there until it was sanctioned in 1920. As noted by one observer, “The Chamber approved a project to regulate work accidents on September 28, 1909. The Senate Legislation Committee came here, studied it, and modified a large part of the project, expanding and correcting it.”

In 1910, public assistance was reorganized by a law that established in Montevideo a general directorate and a Public Assistance council and in the departments “delegated doctors in charge of the functions local.” According to the law, every individual indigent or deprived of resources had “the right to free public assistance at the expense of the State.” This included services such as child protection, assistance and protection of pregnant women and women in labor, assistance and guardianship of homeless children, assistance and protection of homeless, invalid and chronic elderly, and sick care. Following the passage of this law 5 new pavilions were built in the House of Isolation, the Germán Segura pavilion was enlarged; and a laboratory was set up in the Psychiatric Clinic of the Insane Asylum along with an external office in the Asylum for Foundlings and Orphans. In addition various establishments "have received aid and subsidies, including the Hospital Galán y Rocha, in Paysandú, and the one in Colonia are nearing completion; the one in Rosario has been inaugurated, and first aid rooms have been set up in Colonia, Rivera and Treinta y Tres." 

That same year the Executive Power offered a pension scheme for agricultural and industrial workers whose annual wage didn’t exceed $300. A plan was also devised by the Insurance Bank “but the lack of satisfactory statistics, the unwillingness of business to submit to the mounting expense of social legislation, and the absence of any wide margin in the wage scale that might be used for employee contributions to a pension fund, checked the acceptance of these plans.” The extension of the retirement pension system to private industry later began with the passage of a law of the 6th of October 1919 that provided for the pensioning of employees in the water, telephone, tramway, telegraph, railway and gas distributing services.

Post Presidency

He was succeeded by Batlle who was re-elected in 1911. He returned to the Senate of Uruguay but then left it to become president of the Banco de la República Oriental del Uruguay in 1916. He held that position until 1928.

Wílliman lived to see much of his and Battle y Ordóñez's democratic legacy destroyed — at least temporarily — by President Gabriel Terra, who reinforced his presidential rule in a coup d'état in 1933.

Death and legacy

Wílliman died in 1934.

A road in Punta del Este and one in Punta Carretas are named after him.

See also

 Politics of Uruguay
 List of political families#Uruguay

References

 :es:Claudio Williman
 :es:José Claudio Williman

People from Montevideo
Presidents of Uruguay
Uruguayan bankers
19th-century Uruguayan lawyers
University of the Republic (Uruguay) alumni
Academic staff of the University of the Republic (Uruguay)
University of the Republic (Uruguay) rectors
Members of the Senate of Uruguay
Uruguayan people of Galician descent
Uruguayan people of French descent
1861 births
1934 deaths
Colorado Party (Uruguay) politicians